Wilsonia is a census-designated place (CDP) in Tulare County, California. It is surrounded by the General Grant Grove section of Kings Canyon National Park.

History 
The community of Wilsonia began as a 100-acre plot of land homesteaded in the 1870s. After several ownership changes, the land was subdivided among residents. The village was officially established in 1918.

The name “Wilsonia” originates from the United States presidential election of 1916. The outcome of the election was decided by votes from the mountain communities of California, which were delayed due to a snowstorm. To commemorate the area's decisive role in President Woodrow Wilson’s reelection, the community was named Wilsonia in his honor.

Geography
According to the United States Census Bureau, the CDP covers an area of 0.3 square miles (0.7 km), all of it land.

While the village is surrounded by Kings Canyon National Park, the village itself is not part of the National Park, and most of the land within Wilsonia is privately owned. Over 200 cabins are located in the village, many of which are summer residences and vacation homes. The 2010 census placed the permanent population of Wilsonia at 5 residents.

Wilsonia Historic District
The entire community of Wilsonia was listed on the National Register of Historic Places in 1996. The U.S. Historic district includes 139 contributing historic structures.

References

Census-designated places in Tulare County, California
Populated places in the Sierra Nevada (United States)